Amram IX ben Yitzhaq ben Amram ben Shalma was the 124th Samaritan High Priest from 1961–1980. He came from the house of Yitzhaq, descendants of Yitzhaq ben Amram ben Shalma. He was the father of Saloum Cohen.

References

1889 births

1980 deaths

Samaritan high priests